Vantage Peak is a  mountain summit located in the Coast Mountains of British Columbia, Canada. It is part of the Joffre Group, which is a subset of the Lillooet Ranges. Precipitation runoff from the peak drains southwest into Twin One Creek thence Lillooet Lake; the north slope drains into headwaters of Cerise Creek; and the east slope drains into Caspar Creek thence Cayoosh Creek which is within the Fraser River watershed. The nearest higher neighbor is Mount Duke,  to the southeast.

History

The mountain was named by the 1957 first ascent party, and the mountain's toponym was officially adopted June 22, 1967, by the Geographical Names Board of Canada.

Climate

Based on the Köppen climate classification, Vantage Peak is located in a subarctic climate zone of western North America. Most weather fronts originate in the Pacific Ocean, and travel east toward the Coast Mountains where they are forced upward by the range (Orographic lift), causing them to drop their moisture in the form of rain or snowfall. As a result, the Coast Mountains experience high precipitation, especially during the winter months in the form of snowfall. Winter temperatures can drop below −20 °C with wind chill factors below −30 °C. The months July through September offer the most favorable weather for climbing Vantage Peak.

See also

 Geography of British Columbia
 Geology of British Columbia

Gallery

References

External links

 Weather: Vantage Peak

Mountains of British Columbia
Pacific Ranges
Two-thousanders of British Columbia
Coast Mountains
Lillooet Land District